Summer Forever is a 2015 musical film directed by Roman White and starring Megan Nicole, Alyson Stoner, Anna Grace Barlow, and Ryan McCartan.  The film was released on September 4, 2015 by Relativity Digital Studios through video on demand.

Synopsis

Three best friends named Sydney, Liv and Chloe make the most of their last summer weekend together before going their separate ways to college. After performing her final song at the coffee shop run by Liv's mother, Sophie, Sydney receives an offer from the head of Starmageddon Records, Austin Nicholas, who thinks she has potential to be a star and wants her to check out a video shoot for one of his recording acts. Chloe and Liv encourage her to go, and they make it one of Sydney's goals on their bucket list of things to do before the weekend is over. Sydney sets another goal to hook up with someone, while Liv's goal is to apply to Juilliard, and Chloe's is to throw a wild party at her house with her parents out of town.

While at Liv's house finding an outfit to wear for the video shoot, Sydney discovers a letter in Liv's bedroom indicating that she has already been accepted to Juilliard. At the shoot, Sydney meets with Austin but tells him she needs time to weigh his offer and her college plans. Chloe meets an interesting guy on the set named Broom, whom she invites to her party. Sydney's next door neighbor and boyfriend, Liam, who plans to be a traveling filmmaker, also attends the shoot but is troubled by what he sees following her meeting with Austin.

As Liv is about to spring the news about Juilliard to her mother, she finds out the coffee shop could be closing due to financial difficulties and decides to throw her dream away as a dancer to help her mother. The girls' friendship is threatened by Liv's sudden change in plans, as Liv takes out her anger over her future on Sydney, who is hurt by the comments hurled at her about how well her life is going by comparison, when she is just as afraid as Liv about her future. Sydney is also disgusted over Liam's insinuation that her meeting with Austin was anything more than professional, for which Liam later apologizes.

When Sophie finds the acceptance letter from Juilliard in the trash, she makes Liv realize this opportunity is way too important to pass up. Meanwhile, Sydney reflects on her late mother, particularly when she was learning music from her, and is reminded to listen to her heart in deciding what comes next. Her father also advises her to follow her heart and says her mother would have been proud of her record deal opportunity, though her parents value her education first and foremost. Sydney ultimately turns down Austin's offer, after which she runs into Liv and Chloe, who were intending to stop her from accepting the deal as well. The three make up after Liv apologizes to Sydney for what she said to her.

At Chloe's party, following Broom's spectacular rooftop display, things go fine until Liv's ex-boyfriend RJ shows up and becomes disruptive. Liv takes a stand against him, pushing him out of her life for good, but when she literally pushes him inside the house, it causes damage to some valuables belonging to Chloe's parents, forcing Chloe to end the party. One item survives the damage, a doll belonging to her mother, but feeling betrayed by her parents' treatment of her throughout her life, Chloe takes her own stand and breaks the doll.

Hours before the girls leave, Liam surprises Sydney in the treehouse by their homes, with many pictures he has taken of her over the years and a song expressing how much he loves her. The two share a kiss, and Liam tells Sydney he will miss her. The girls meet on the beach one more time, with Sydney giving Liv a plane ticket to New York, as she and Chloe surprise her with news that she will be starting at Juilliard this semester. Liv and Chloe will live together in New York, while Sydney heads to Boston.

Cast

Main characters
 Megan Nicole as Sydney
 Alyson Stoner as Liv
 Anna Grace Barlow as Chloe
 Ryan McCartan as Liam

Supporting characters
 Daphne Zuniga as Sophie Paladino – Liv's mom.
 Andrew Bowen as Chris McAvoy – Sydney's dad.
 Stephen Colletti as Austin Nicholas – the "record label guy" from Starmageddon Records
 Cody Johns as RJ – Liv's ex-boyfriend.
 Jansen Panettiere as Broom – a stunt man in the music video shoot and Chloe's love interest.
 Karissa Vacker as Jasmine – Austin's assistant.
 Meg DeAngelis as April – the stage coordinator of the music video shoot
 Christina Ferraro as Sydney's late mom
 Madison Flores as a stylist in the music video shoot
 Alexis Maldonado as Young Sydney
 Taylor Locasio as Young Liv
 Hannah Swain as Young Chloe
 Jack Kwit as Young Liam
 We the Kings as themselves
 Heather Braverman as a performer in Sophie's coffee shop

Soundtrack

The official film soundtrack was released on the same day as the film. The album includes ten original songs by the cast, one of them being a new version of Megan Nicole's single "Summer Forever" (originally released in 2013). Music videos of the songs "Weekend Warriors", "About Tonight", "Ours to Lose", and "Powerless" were released through the movie's YouTube channel and some of the cast's own YouTube channels. The album was distributed by the Relativity Music Group and the music was produced by Sam Hollander.

Track listing

Release
On February 20, 2015, Megan Nicole posted a video on her YouTube channel announcing she would be a making a film based on her 2013 single, "Summer Forever". Originally, the film was set to be released in August 2015, but later, the cast announced that it would be released on September 4, 2015.

References

External links
 

2010s English-language films